IntelePeer is a privately held company based in San Mateo, California, and is a Communications Platform as a Service (CPaaS) provider of voice, messaging, automation, applications, APIs, and analytics for enterprises.

The company is backed by venture capital firms VantagePoint Venture Partners, Kennet Partners, NorthCap Partners and EDF Ventures.

Corporate history 

IntelePeer was founded as VoEX, Inc. in 2003 to provide core network VoIP services to large communications services providers, universities, large enterprises and VoIP applications developers. The company was originally based in Grand Rapids, Michigan.

In July 2006, the company completed a series B funding round for $12 million led by Kennet Partners.

In September 2006, the company moved its global headquarters to Foster City, California.

In October 2006, the company introduced its SuperRegistry, which combines interconnection call signaling and media translation, and ENUM Telephone number mapping registry capabilities to allow peering partners who participated in the SuperRegistry to complete calls with each other through direct digital connections to reduce long distance and international call expenses for customers.

VoEX changed its name to IntelePeer, Inc. in September 2007.

In September 2008, IntelePeer launched its AppWorx communications-enabling application development environment offering an application programming interface (API) based on Web standards like PHP and REST to help service providers and application developers to voice-enable their applications.

In November 2008, IntelePeer completed a series C round of financing for $18 million. The financing was led by new investor VantagePoint Venture Partners of San Bruno, California, with participation by existing investors.

In October 2009, IntelePeer joined the Microsoft Partner Program to integrate its platform with Windows Live applications.

In May 2011 the company initially filed to go public. In January 2012 the company withdrew its request to go public and remains private at this time.

In October 2015 IntelePeer acquired Advantone, a cloud contact center company based in Plantation, Florida. IntelePeer added Advantone's contact center suite to its product line, creating the Atmosphere cloud communications platform.  

In 2016, IntelePeer announced its partnership with Cisco to become the first PSTN provider for Cisco's Spark and Meraki products.

In March 2018, IntelePeer moved to multi-channel communications with its launch of  Atmosphere Messaging, which enables companies to configure their business phone lines to send and receive SMS messages.  

In October 2018, IntelePeer  launched  a new partner portal designed to help channel partners develop and nurture Communications Platform as a Service (CPaaS) business opportunities.

References

Telecommunications companies of the United States
2003 establishments in California